Goodenia porphyrea is a species of flowering plant in the family Goodeniaceae and is endemic to the northern parts of the Northern Territory. It is a low-lying to prostrate herb with stiff hairs, and with egg-shaped leaves at the base of the plant and racemes of purplish to apricot or brownish flowers.

Description
Flowering mostly occurs from March to April and the fruit is a more or less spherical capsule  in diameter.

Taxonomy and naming
This species was first formally described in 1979 by Roger Charles Carolin in the journal Brunonia and given the name Calogyne porphyrea from specimens collected in 1966. In 1990, Carolin changed the name to Goodenia porphyrea in the journal Telopea. The specific epithet (porphyrea) means "purple or purplish-red".

Distribution and habitat
This goodenia grows in grassy woodland on black soil plains and on the edges of swamps and saline coastal flats in northern parts of the Northern Territory.

Conservation status
Goodenia holtzeana is list as of "least concern" under the Northern Territory Government Territory Parks and Wildlife Conservation Act 1976.

References

porphyrea
Flora of the Northern Territory
Plants described in 1979
Taxa named by Roger Charles Carolin
Endemic flora of Australia